The Baltic governorates, or the Baltic provinces, was a collective name for the administrative subunits of the then Russian Empire (1721–1917) in what is now Estonia and Latvia. The governorates were set up on territories of the previous Swedish Estonia and Swedish Livonia (both in 1721), and the Duchy of Courland and Semigallia (in 1795).

History
The Treaty of Vilnius of 1561 included the Privilegium Sigismundi Augusti by which the Polish King Sigismund II Augustus guaranteed the Livonian estates several privileges, including religious freedom with respect to the Augsburg Confession, the Indigenat, and continuation of the traditional German jurisdiction and administration. The terms regarding religious freedom forbade any regulation of the traditional Protestant order by religious or secular authorities, and ruled that cases of disagreements be judged only by Protestant scholars. When in 1710 Estonia and Livonia capitulated to Russia during the Great Northern War, the capitulations explicitly referred to the Privilegium Sigismundi Augusti, with the respective references being confirmed in the Treaty of Nystad (1721).

The dominions of Swedish Estonia (in what is now northern Estonia) and Swedish Livonia (in what is now southern Estonia and northern Latvia) became the governorates of Reval and Riga, when they were conquered by Russia during the Great Northern War, and then ceded by Sweden in the Treaty of Nystad in 1721. Notably, both Reval Governorate and Riga Governorate were each at the time subdivided into one province only: the province of Estonia and the province of Livonia, respectively. In the period of the so-called Regency, 1783–1796, the Regent's (later Governor-General's) Office in Riga was created. It consisted of two subdivisions dealing with local matters and Russian affairs.

After an administrative reform in 1796, the Reval Governorate was renamed Governorate of Estland, and Riga Governorate renamed Governorate of Livland. The "third" Baltic province of Courland was annexed into Russian Empire after the third partition of the Polish–Lithuanian Commonwealth in 1795.

The Baltic Governor-General was the representative of the Russian Emperor in the provinces of Livland, Estland and Courland. He was appointed by the Emperor and was subject to the latter as well as to the Senate. His duties were regulated by laws and instructions from central authorities. From the beginning of the 19th century he acted as an intermediary between the government ministries in capital city Saint Petersburg and the local administration of the Baltic governorates.

The Governor-General, the highest local executive official and military authority, was in charge of the internal order in the provinces and had to take care of their overall security. He was in charge of recruiting troops and had to keep an eye on the garrisons and fortifications. His civil duties included supervising the provincial administration and prisons, maintaining land roads and bridges, issuing passports, and overseeing collection of state taxes and customs duties. He appointed and dismissed higher officials. The Office of the Baltic Governor-General was abolished in 1876, at the beginning of the Russification campaign in the provinces.

Similarly to the autonomous Grand Duchy of Finland, the Baltic Governorates until the end of 19th century were not a subject to the common civil and administrative laws of the Russian Empire, but did not have monetary, fiscal and passport system of their own. Like guberniyas of the Kingdom of Poland they were treated as an integral entity and the Russian law provided them the preservation of local authorities. In Baltics these were Landtags. The special legislation which set rules for municipal administration and entrepreneurship according to local traditions, as well as the privileges to the local nobility in the Baltics was known under the collective name of Ostsee Right.

From the end of the 18th century through 1917 names and territories of the Governorate of Courland, the Governorate of Livland and the Governorate of Estland remained unchanged. After the Russian Revolution of 1917 and loss of control over the territories to the German Empire during the later stages of World War I, the governorships ceased to exist. In their place, two newly independent countries, Estonia and Latvia, were established in 1918.

List of governors-general 

 Aleksandr Danilovich Menshikov (1710–1719) as governor-general of Ingria
 Fyodor Apraksin (1719–1728)
 Friedrich Baron von Löwen (et) (1728–1736)
 Platon Ivanovich Musin-Pushkin (ru) (1736)
 Gustaf Otto Douglas (1736–1740)
 Ulrich Friedrich Woldemar von Löwendal (1740–1743)
 Peter August, Duke of Schleswig-Holstein-Sonderburg-Beck (1743–1753, 1758–1775)
 Vladimir Petrovich Dolgorukov (et) (1753–1758)
 George Browne (1775–1792)
 Nicholas Repnin (1792–1798)
 Ludwig von Nagel (ru) (1798–1800)
 Peter Ludwig von der Pahlen (1800–1801)
 Sergei Fyodorovich Golitsyn (ru) (1801–1803)
 Friedrich Wilhelm von Buxhoeveden (1803–1808)
 Duke George of Oldenburg (1808–1809)
 Berend Johann von Uexküll (et) (1809–1811, 1816–1818)
 Augustus, Grand Duke of Oldenburg (1811–1816)
 Philip Osipovich Paulucci (1818–1829)
 Carl Magnus von der Pahlen (de) (1829–1845)
 Yevgeny Golovin (1845–1847)
 Alexander Arkadyevich Suvorov (1848–1861)
 Wilhelm Heinrich von Lieven (et) (1861–1864)
 Pyotr Andreyevich Shuvalov (1864–1866)
 Eduard Baranov (ru) (1866)
 Peter Albedinskiy (ru) (1866–1870)
 Peter Bagrationi (1870–1876)

Listing

See also 
 Autonomous Governorate of Estonia (1917–1918)
 Administrative division of Congress Poland
 Lithuania Governorate

Notes

References

 
Governorates-General of the Russian Empire
1721 establishments in Russia